İçmeler is a village in the Gölyaka District of Düzce Province in Turkey. Its population is 739 (2022). The village is populated by Kurds.

References

Villages in Gölyaka District
Kurdish settlements in East Marmara Region